The 2015 Trafford Metropolitan Borough Council election was scheduled to take place on 7 May 2015 to elect members of Trafford Metropolitan Borough Council in England. This was on the same day as other local elections. One third of the council was up for election, with each successful candidate serving a four-year term of office, expiring in 2019. The Conservative Party held overall control of the council.

The current composition of the Council is as follows:

Results

By ward

Altrincham ward

Ashton upon Mersey ward

Bowdon ward

Broadheath ward

Brooklands ward

Bucklow-St. Martins ward
Cllr. John Smith defected from the Labour Party to the Conservative Party in May 2016 and stood down in 2017 forcing a by-election which saw Aidan Williams regain the seat for Labour.

Clifford ward

Davyhulme East ward

Davyhulme West ward

Flixton ward

Gorse Hill ward

Hale Barns ward

Hale Central ward

Longford ward

Priory ward

Sale Moor ward

St. Mary's ward

Stretford ward

Timperley ward

Urmston ward

Village ward

References

2015 English local elections
May 2015 events in the United Kingdom
2015
2010s in Greater Manchester